Presidential elections were held in South Korea on 27 April 1971. The result was a victory for incumbent president Park Chung-hee, who won 53.2% of the vote. Voter turnout was 79.8%. Within a year of his re-election, Park declared martial law and introduced the Yushin Constitution, which vested him with sweeping and near-dictatorial powers.

These would be the last contested presidential elections in South Korea until 1981, and the last direct presidential elections until 1987.

Nominations

Democratic Republican Party
The DRP Convention was held on 17 March 1971, at which incumbent president Park Chung-hee became the presidential nominee. Under the constitution, Park would have normally been ineligible to run in 1971, as presidents were limited to two consecutive terms. However, shortly after his re-election in 1967, the DRP-dominated legislature passed a constitutional amendment allowing the incumbent president to run for three consecutive terms.

New Democratic Party
By tradition, the most senior members of the party leadership were supposed to run for president. It was assumed that either former Korea University president Yu Jin-oh, the sitting party chair Yu Jin-san, or former president Yun Po-sun would be chosen for the party's candidate. However, the norm was broken by lawmaker Kim Young-sam, who was only in his early forties, when he declared his bid for the New Democratic nomination for president on 8 November 1969. He was followed by Kim Dae-jung and Lee Cheol-seung, both prominent politicians in their forties. The party leadership tried to discourage the three candidates at first, but later conceded that it was now time for the new generation to take over. Lee Cheol-seung withdrew his bid and endorsed Kim Dae-jung after the party leadership, including Chairman Yu Jin-san, announced they would be backing Kim Young-sam.

At the convention held on 29 September 1970, the establishment-endorsed Kim Young-sam surprisingly lost to the minority faction's Kim Dae-jung, who became the party's candidate.

Results

By province

References

South Korea
Presidential
Presidential elections in South Korea